"The One You Love" is a song by American musician and singer-songwriter Glenn Frey, most famous as singer and guitarist for the Eagles. It was released as the lead single from his debut solo album No Fun Aloud, in 1982. Ernie Watts and Jim Horn are featured on the tenor saxophone. Watts plays the repeating theme, while Horn plays the closing solo. The single features the track, "All Those Lies", as the B-side, which is also included in the album.

The song was also one of three of Frey's solo hits performed during the Eagles' 1994-1996 Hell Freezes Over tour, the others being "You Belong to the City" and "The Heat is On", wherein bassist Timothy B. Schmit sings along with Frey. During performances of "The One You Love" on the said tour, Al Garth played the saxophone parts while Don Henley did the drumming.

Personnel 
 Glenn Frey – vocals, guitar, bass, Fender Rhodes electric piano, Linn LM-1 programming 
 Ernie Watts – tenor saxophone
 Jim Horn – tenor saxophone
 Jim Ed Norman – string arrangements

Chart performance
"The One You Love" reached No. 15 on the Billboard Hot 100, No. 68 in Canada, No. 36 in New Zealand and No. 50 in Australia. It also peaked at No. 2 on the U.S. Adult Contemporary chart.

Track listing
7" single
A. "The One You Love" – 4:35	
B. "All Those Lies" – 4:42

Charts

References

1982 songs
1982 singles
Glenn Frey songs
Asylum Records singles
Rock ballads
Songs written by Jack Tempchin
Songs written by Glenn Frey
Smooth jazz songs